There have been 28 seasons in eight years of Tom Clancy's Rainbow Six Siege in the form of downloadable content. In most of the seasons, the downloadable content has introduced a new map or a rework of an existing one and at least two new operators to play. However, developer Jean-Baptiste Halle announced at the Six Invitational 2020 that only one new operator would be introduced each season after the third season of Year 5. The inaugural season began in February 2016 with Operation Black Ice, and the game is currently in its twenty-eighth season, Operation Commanding Force, which is the first season of Year 8. There are currently 24 maps between four game modes, and 67 operators (excluding Recruit) to choose from between attacking and defending.

Year 1

Operation Black Ice  
Operation Black Ice, the inaugural season of Tom Clancy's Rainbow Six Siege, was released on 2 February 2016. The operation introduced a new map, a frozen yacht in Canada. It also introduced two Canadian operators from the special operations force Joint Task Force 2, Frost and Buck. Frost is a defending operator who can use a device similar to a bear trap to incapacitate enemies, while Buck, the attacking operator, has an under-barrel M26 shotgun.

Operation Dust Line 
The second season of Year 1, Operation Dust Line, was released on 11 May 2016. The operation introduced a new map set in the Middle East, "Border", described as "a mix of old and new construction with open-air pathways". It also introduced two Navy SEAL operators, Blackbeard and Valkyrie. Blackbeard, the attacking operator, has mountable face shields for his rifle; while Valkyrie, the defending operator, has three (originally four) omnidirectional cameras that are throwable onto any surface.

Operation Skull Rain 
Operation Skull Rain, the third season, was released on August 2, 2016. The operation introduced a new map set in a favela in Brazil, and two BOPE operators called Capitão and Caveira. Capitão, an attacking operator, has a tactical crossbow capable of loading asphyxiating bolts, that will burn oxygen within a certain radius, or smoke grenade bolts that create a thick cloud of smoke. The defending operator, Caveira, has an ability called Silent Step, allowing her to make less noise when moving as well as interrogate an immobilized enemy for the location of other enemies.

Operation Red Crow 
The fourth and final season of Year 1, Operation Red Crow, was released on 17 November 2016. The operation introduced a new map set in a skyscraper in Japan, and two SAT operators called Hibana and Echo. As an attacking operator, Hibana possesses a weapon that launches up to sixteen pellets shot in either charges of 2, 4, or 6 that attach to and break reinforced walls. Echo, the defending operator, uses a drone capable of releasing sonic blasts to disorient enemies.

Year 2

Operation Velvet Shell 
Operation Velvet Shell, the first season of Year 2, was released on 8 February 2017. The operation introduced a new map set in Spain (Coastline), and two GEO operators called Mira and Jackal. Jackal is a tracker on the attacking team who can reveal the location of enemies by tracking their footprints, while Mira is a defender who can create one-way ejectable bulletproof windows on walls, leaving space for operators to fire through.

Operation Health 
The second season of Year 2, Operation Health released on 6 June 2017. The operation was an update that fine-tuned many of the game's aspects, including fixes to hitboxes, spawn killing and audio issues. The update resulted in the delay of planned season's content and the cancellation of a map.

Operation Blood Orchid 
Operation Blood Orchid was the third season of Year 2 and released on 5 September 2017. The operation introduced a new map (Theme Park) set in Hong Kong, two SDU operators named Ying and Lesion, and one Polish GROM operator named Ela. Ying, an attacking operator, utilizes candela cluster charges that can be thrown or attached to a surface to stun enemies, similar to a stun grenade. On the defending team, Lesion uses poison mines that slow and cause damage to an enemy over time when triggered. Ela, also a defending operator, possesses proximity concussion mines that can be attached to multiple surfaces to disorient enemies.

Operation White Noise 
Operation White Noise served as the fourth and final season of Year 2 and released on 5 December 2017. The operation introduced “Tower”, a new map set in South Korea, two South Korean operators from the 707th Special Mission Battalion named Dokkaebi and Vigil, and one Polish GROM operator named Zofia. Dokkaebi is an attacker who can hack enemy phones to make them ring, revealing their position. She can also hack the phone of a dead defender to give attackers access to cameras. Vigil is a defender who uses a cloaking device to become invisible to all drones and cameras. On the attacking team, Zofia carries a double-barreled grenade launcher capable of launching explosive or concussion grenades.

Year 3

Operation Chimera 
Serving as the first season of Year 3, Operation Chimera released on 6 March 2018. The operation introduced one GIGN operator named Lion, and one Spetsnaz operator named Finka. Both are part of a CBRN specialist detachment of Team Rainbow. As an attacking operator, Lion uses a UAV to expose moving enemies via sonar temporarily; Finka is also an attacking operator and uses nanomachines to temporarily increase the health and accuracy of herself and her teammates, as well as reviving any downed teammates. Her ability also increases their heart and breathing rate, thus weakening them by increasing the damage taken by Smoke's toxic gas canisters, increasing the range Pulse's heartbeat scanner can detect them, and hindering their ability to listen for footsteps. This DLC also introduced a temporary game mode called "Outbreak", a PvE game mode which tasks operators with containing a biohazard that has turned the citizens of Truth or Consequences, New Mexico into zombie-like monsters.

Operation Para Bellum 
Released on 7 June 2018, Operation Para Bellum was the second season of Year 3. The operation introduced a new map set in Tuscany, "Villa", as well as two GIS operators named Alibi and Maestro. Alibi is a defending operator who can project inanimate holograms of herself, which expose the location of any enemy that interacts with the hologram with their weapons, body, or drone. Also a defender, Maestro can install a bulletproof wall-mounted directed-energy turret that he can then operate remotely, damaging enemies with rapid laser fire. When the turret is firing it is no longer bulletproof, and after a certain number of shots, the turret can overheat and has to cool down.

Operation Grim Sky 
Operation Grim Sky, the third season of Year 3, was released on 4 September 2018. The operation introduced two new operators and the first full map redesign for Hereford Base. On attack is Maverick, a US Delta Force operator who uses a small handheld blowtorch that can create small holes in reinforced walls, opening new lines of sight. On defense is Clash, a Metropolitan Police Service officer who is the first shield-wielding defender. Her shield is similar to Montagne's, with the addition of a device called the Crowd Control Electro Shield, or CCE, which emits an electric field that slows and damages attackers.

Operation Wind Bastion 
In the fourth and final season of Year 3, Operation Wind Bastion, which released on 4 December 2018, the operation introduced a new map set in Morocco, "Fortress", and two GIGR operators named Kaid and Nomad. Kaid, a defending operator, can throw a gadget called Electroclaws that can electrify reinforced surfaces, barbed wire, and deployable shields. On the attacking side, Nomad possesses a weapon attachment called an AirJab launcher, which launches proximity-triggered air-blast grenades that can stick to surfaces and throw opposing operators to the ground.

Year 4

Operation Burnt Horizon 
Operation Burnt Horizon marked the first season of Year 4, which released on 6 March 2019. The operation introduced a new map set in the Outback of Australia, along with two operators from SASR, Mozzie and Gridlock. Mozzie is a defender whose gadget is an autonomous robot called "Pest" that hacks the attacker's drones, letting him use them. The attacker, Gridlock, has a gadget called "Trax Stingers" which is a throwable gadget that deploys multiple road spike-like hexagonal stinger mats until they are either destroyed or cover the area. A midseason update in Operation Burnt Horizon introduced a rework of Lion's ability. Instead of giving body outlines of detected enemy operators, Lion and his teammates instead receive a ping of their location. Furthermore, Ubisoft implemented a reduction of duration, warning, and cooldown time of Lion's gadget.

Operation Phantom Sight 
Operation Phantom Sight was the second season of Year 4 and released on 11 June 2019. The operation introduced two new operators, Nøkk and Warden. It also introduced a rework for the map Kafe Dostoyevsky. Nøkk is an attacking operator from the Danish Jaeger Corps who uses her HEL Presence Reduction Device to muffle her footsteps and wipe her images from cameras. Warden is a defending operator from the United States Secret Service who comes equipped with a pair of Glance Smart Glasses, which eliminate the effects of flashbangs and allow him to see through smoke.

Operation Ember Rise 
In the third season of Year 4, Operation Ember Rise, which released on 11 September 2019, the operation introduced a rework of Kanal and two new operators, Amaru and Goyo. A member of the Peruvian APCA, Amaru is an attacking operator who uses the Garra Hook to grapple or hoist herself onto or through ledges, windows, or open hatches. On the defending team, Goyo is a member of the Mexican Fuerzas Especiales who possesses Volcán Shields that are similar to deployable shields but armed with incendiary bombs on the rear end, which can be detonated by gunfire.

Operation Shifting Tides 
Operation Shifting Tides is the fourth and final season of Year 4, which released on 3 December 2019. The operation introduces a rework of Theme Park and two new operators from a private military company called the Nighthaven Special Intervention Group. From India is Kali, an attacking operator armed with a CSRX 300 bolt-action marksman rifle that can toggle between 5× to 12× magnification. Her weapon also comes with an under-barrel attachment called the LV Explosive Lance, which is capable of destroying defenders' gadgets that are within its radius of effect. Meanwhile, on the defending team, Wamai is a Kenyan operator who uses the Mag-NET System that captures the projectiles of attacking operators thrown or launched within its radius and then releases them after a short time for them to take effect finally. Wamai is the first DLC defending operator to have an assault rifle in his loadout.

With this season, the game introduces a limb penetration system in which some weapon types will be able to hit more than one target at once. This new system will also take damage modifiers and armour ratings into account when it comes to hit registration. In Shifting Tides, the update changed the game's rappel feature in how one exits from rappelling. Before, players would automatically enter an exit animation once they reached the top of a building. With the update, players would now receive a prompt to confirm whether they wish to exit rappel. The new operation also introduces a rework of Jackal's tracking gadget. Among other changes, there are now four different colours of footprints that show how old they are and how many times an enemy operator will be pinged depending on the colour. A change was also made to Smoke's gas grenades in that they will not be able to spread through solid walls and are unable to obstruct vision.

Year 5

Operation Void Edge 
Operation Void Edge is the first season of Year 5, which began on 10 March 2020. The season was first announced by Ubisoft on 10 February 2020, during the Six Invitational. The new season introduces Iana, a Dutch attacking operator who formerly worked on a European Union space project. Iana's gadget, the Gemini Replicator, creates a controllable hologram similar to Alibi's gadget, but is mobile and can be used for intelligence gathering. For the defending team, Void Edge introduces Oryx, a Jordanian operator who has no technological gadget. Instead, his ability is the Remah Dash, which can allow him to run through breakable walls (at the cost of five health points per use), jump up through broken hatches, and knockdown opponents. Void Edge also introduces a rework of Oregon in which the most notable alteration is the removal of the tower bomb site. In that site's place is meeting hall and kitchen.

There are several operator reworks introduced in the new season. Lesion's Gu Mine will no longer deal initial damage, but will instead deal two health points of damage every few seconds. The Gu Mine icon will also disappear on Lesion's HUD if he loses line of sight on the Gu Mine, making it more difficult for the player to determine which one was triggered. The intent of this rework is for Lesion's gadget to be more useful in slowing attackers than for accurate intelligence gathering. As for Twitch, her drone will have infinite shocks with the caveat of only having three shocks at a time. Instead of giving ten health points of damage to players, the drone will only deal one point per shock. Ubisoft made this change to focus her drone on gadget destruction rather than directly attacking players.

Midway through Void Edge, Ubisoft released a patch that made several notable changes to the game. In the patch, the developers reduced Jäger to a two-speed, two-armour operator. The developers explained the reasoning behind the change in the Designer's Notes that Jäger had a pick rate in competitive matches that was greater than 90 per cent. Mozzie was another target of the patch, removing the Super Shorty from his loadout. The patch also reduced the number of Volcán Shields in Goyo's possession and swapped Buck's frag grenade for a claymore. In the update, Ying was given an additional candela, replaced her claymore with smoke grenades, and increased the damage of the T-95 LSW. However, one week later, Ubisoft issued another update reverting the number of Ying's candelas to three.

Operation Steel Wave 
Operation Steel Wave is the second season of Year 5, which began on 16 June 2020. Ubisoft announced the name of the season on 13 May 2020, and revealed the new operators over the next few days. The season introduces Ace, a Norwegian attacker hailing from Nighthaven. Ace's unique gadget is the SELMA Aqua Breacher. This gadget can be thrown in a similar manner to a grenade where it will deploy up to three hydraulically powered breaching charges that will sequentially detonate large holes into soft or reinforced surfaces. It is worth noting that Ace will need two of his available three SELMAs to destroy a single reinforced hatch. The South African defender is Melusi, an operative from a notable anti-poaching task force. Her unique gadget is the Banshee Sonic Defense gadget, which emits a low frequency humming noise that dramatically reduces attacker movement and alerts defenders to their position when within its effective radius. The season brings forth the thoroughly reworked House map which sees reimagined rooms and overall scale adjustments for more balanced gameplay. This season also saw the introduction of a new secondary gadget available to select defenders; the Proximity Alarm.

Further operator changes saw the removal of the turning radius penalty of Ela and Zofia's concussion effects, as well as a fixed duration and removal of screen shaking effects from sonic bursts generated by  Echo's Yokai drone. Amaru's Garra Hook will no longer destroy wooden barricades on windows it attaches to; only when Amaru goes through the barricades herself. Alibi and Maestro's ACS-12 shotgun now shoots slugs instead of traditional buckshot. Regarding playlists, all Ranked MMR ratings are unified on each platform. Players can no longer obtain different skill ratings by swapping data centers to play Ranked in different regions, and the Champion Rank leaderboard is now worldwide as a result. New prerequisites for Ranked involve a raise in clearance level from 30 to 50 to unlock the Ranked playlist, and eligibility for Champion Rank requires completing at least 100 Ranked games each season as a means of deterring cheaters. Furthermore, a new match cancellation feature has been added to Ranked that will allow players to cancel matches in the event of unbalanced teams at the start of a match. Teams will be able to initiate a cancellation during the Preparation Phase of the first round, followed by a voting prompt to end the match. A majority vote will terminate the match immediately and no penalties or sanctions will be given to either team, unless players abandon the match before the cancellation vote is decided.

Operation Shadow Legacy 
Operation Shadow Legacy is the third season of Year 5. Ubisoft announced the name of the season on August 12, 2020. The season introduces Splinter Cell's Sam Fisher, under the moniker of Zero, as Siege's first-ever guest character. Zero's unique gadget is the Argus Launcher, which allows him to deploy multiple two-way cameras on soft or reinforced surfaces that can fire a single-shot laser that can destroy defender gadgets in a single hit. The map Chalet got a major rework, with the kitchen and basement locations staying mostly the same, as Ubisoft believed they were strong locations to begin with. Multiple operators got one of their secondary gadgets replaced with hard breaching charges, which activate when placed and can add a medium-sized hole that players are able to vault through in reinforced surfaces. The breaching charge completely destroys unreinforced doors, windows, and hatches. A map-ban has been added to unranked and ranked modes. A minimum of 1 map out of 3 is voted out at the beginning of a match, with each team voting at the same time. If the majority of the 2 teams vote for different maps, the third is chosen, and the teams progress to the operator ban sequence. If the 2 teams vote for the same map, one of two remaining maps is chosen.

Ubisoft has stated that later in the season, they are removing the "vote to kick" option, as they feel it has strayed from its original purpose and is now used as an extra form of toxicity. Maverick now has 6 canisters in his blowtorch instead of 5, as Ubisoft wanted to be more forgiving of players mistakes when opening hatches. The new 1.5x and 2x scopes were added in with this new update, as well as a rework of the holographic and red dot sights for certain operators, while several operators have lost access to the 2.5x ACOG scope in favour of the 1.5x and the 2x scopes. A reinforcement pool has been added, meaning that the entire team shares 10 reinforcements, as AFK players removed overall defensive power for the team. In November, a patch was released that redesigned Tachanka, changing his gadget from a machine gun turret into an incendiary grenade launcher while also allowing him to wield the machine gun as a primary weapon.

Operation Neon Dawn 
Operation Neon Dawn is the fourth and final season of Year 5. The expansion was teased on November 3, 2020, and was fully revealed at the Six November 2020 Major on November 8, 2020. This season introduces Aruni, a Thai defending operator who possesses a gadget that, when attached to a doorway or wall, can damage one attacker or destroy one attacker gadget every 30 seconds. This season also introduced a Skyscraper map rework.

Year 6

Crimson Heist 
Crimson Heist is the first season of Year 6 and was released on March 16, 2021. This season introduces Flores, an Argentinian attacking operator who performed several heists, before becoming an asset to the FBI. Flores is the first operator to be openly gay. Flores' unique gadget is the RCE-Ratero Charge drone, which is an explosive drone that can be both manually and automatically detonated with enough power to breach soft surfaces, clear defender utility and kill operators. This season also saw a minor rework to the Border map, which mainly increased room space and reduced the amount of destructible walls. This season also introduces a new secondary weapon, the GONNE-6. The GONNE-6 holds one explosive round, which can be used to destroy enemy utility, including bulletproof gadgets, and breach soft surfaces. Several operators on the Attacking side saw this weapon replace one of their secondary firearms.

Crimson Heist also saw the introduction of the Match Replay system, allowing players to view their previous 12 matches played. Originally announced at the beginning of Year 5, delays saw the beta version be added in Year 6. Notable operator changes include Kali, whose CSRX 300 bolt-action marksman rifle will no longer one-shot DBNO, but rather down or kill operators depending on what armor class the target has, and Blackbeard, whose mounted shield's HP has been reduced and weapon damage decreased. This season also saw the removal of the Year Pass, instead opting for new operators to be added in each season's Battle Pass, with an exclusivity period before they can be bought with Renown or R6 credits.

North Star 
North Star is the second season of Year 6 and was released June 14, 2021. This season introduces Thunderbird, a defending operator from the Nakoda Territories of United States and Canada. Thunderbird's unique gadget is the Kóna Station, which is a deployable gadget that shoots healing pellets to both attackers and defenders within range. The Kóna Station can also revive operators in a DBNO state, but the operators in such a state must manually activate it themselves. This season includes a casual-focused rework of the Favela map, which overhauls most of the map, from the removal of most external breachable walls, to the expansion of internal rooms.

North Star introduces several changes originally announced at the beginning of Year 6. One such change is the ability to break the glass on Mira's Black Mirrors and Maestro's Evil Eyes, as well as bulletproof cameras. Another change is the change to Melusi's Banshee Sonic Defences, which causes them to no longer be bulletproof once they're activated. Announced to appear on the test servers for North Star, but not to make it to live servers this season is the "Gameplay After Death" mechanic, which is another feature announced at the beginning of Year 6. This will allow players to use their drones and gadgets after they die in game. Barrel attachments are being changed this season as to make it clearer as to what they do. The compensator attachment now solely helps with horizontal recoil, while the flash hider attachment helps solely with vertical recoil.

Notable operator changes in North Star include changes to Ash and Vigil. Both Ash's R4-C assault rifle and Vigil's K1A submachine gun have increased recoil, and the amount of Ash's breaching rounds have been reduced from three to two. Other notable operator changes are the changes to Mira, Melusi and Maestro's gadgets. Smoke's Remote Gas Grenade has been changed. This change prevents the smoke released from the gadget from expanding through walls, causing it to propagate in a way similar to Capitão's smoke rounds from his crossbow. The grenades have a different look and play a new sound once activated.

Crystal Guard 
Crystal Guard is the third season of Year 6 and was released to test servers on August 17, 2021. This season introduces Osa, an attacking operator from Croatia. Osa's unique gadget is the Talon-8 Shield, a bulletproof clear shield that can be both carried and deployed by the player. It can be deployed directly on the ground, or through barricaded windows. It has a pressurized gas canister similar to the canister on Mira's Black Mirror, which destroys the entire window when it is hit. This season also introduces minor reworks to Bank, Coastline, and Clubhouse, adding features such as spawnpeek obstructions and minor reworks to individual rooms.

Crystal Guard also introduces Elite Customization, allowing players who have purchased Elite Skins for operators to swap out the headgear or uniform of the operator with the Elite skin. The new season also implements a feature demonstrated in the testing server for North Star: the replacement of the Armor system with an HP increase. This removes the damage reduction applied to 2 and 1 speed operators, and replaces it with a new health system: 100 HP to 3 speed, 1 armor operators, 110 HP to 2 speed, 2 armor operators, and 125 HP to 1 speed, 3 armor operators.

Crystal Guard introduces several changes to operator's abilities and weapons. Fuze's Cluster Charge can now be deployed through reinforced walls and hatches, but takes longer to activate, giving Defenders an opportunity to destroy the charge before significant damage is done. The charge cannot be destroyed from the opposite side of the reinforced wall it is breaching until it has started deploying mini-grenades, and always fires one, even when it is destroyed as soon as possible. Twitch now has a regular drone during the prep phase, but can use both Shock Drones during the action phase. In addition, the Shock Drone's Taser has been reworked to be a Laser, with infinite range and five damage instead of one. It also destroys gadgets, instead of disabling them.

High Calibre 
High Calibre, the fourth and final season of Year 6, released on December 14, 2021 and introduces Thorn, an Irish defender with the gadget Razorbloom Shell. This gadget explodes once the player is proximity of it, propagating shrapnel within a certain radius. It behaves like a proximity mine, and has falloff like grenades do. High Calibre introduces a rework of Outback, the map based on the Australian Outback. Another update this season is the brand new HUD.

Year 7

Demon Veil

Demon Veil, the first season of Year 7, released on March 15, 2022 and introduces Azami, a Japanese defending operator, whose unique gadget is the Kiba Barrier. This barrier is a throwable kunai blade that creates a circular concrete barrier at its impact point. This wall is bulletproof, and can only be destroyed by explosives or other gadgets, such as Sledge's hammer. Alongside the new operator, a map called Emerald Plains was released, which is the first new map since the release of Outback in Burnt Horizon (Year 4 Season 1).

Several changes to the core gameplay of Rainbow Six Siege were introduced in Demon Veil. All 1x sights were unlocked for use on most weapons, allowing players to use nearly any optic they prefer on any primary weapon. Before this change, weapons were restricted to particular sights, which inhibited the player's ability to personalize their gun. Another core gameplay change introduced is attacker repick, which allows attackers to change their operators during the majority of the preparation phase.

Vector Glare
Vector Glare, the second season of Year 7, released on June 14, 2022 and introduces the Belgian attacking operator Sens. Their unique gadget is the ROU Projector, a disc-shaped device that can be rolled and creates a light screen in its path. This screen obstructs player vision, but does not block any damage, projectiles, or bullets. Sens released with the POF-9 assault rifle, the first new primary weapon introduced to the game since Kali's CSRX 300 sniper rifle during Operation Shifting Tides. During this season, the map Close Quarter was released. This map is made particularly for the team deathmatch gamemode, and is not playable in casual or ranked.

Along with the main content of the update, several quality of life changes were made. A shooting range was added, which allows players to test weapons with different attachments. For each operator, a series of videos and instructions were added to teach new or unfamiliar players how to use their gadgets. Vector Glare also marks the start of a reputation system. This system was added to discourage toxicity and promote positive behavior among the community. The reputation system started by giving warnings to toxic players during its "grace period," and later began to issue penalties for negative behavior. In the future, the system will reward players that are in a positive standing.

Player privacy options were also added in this season. One such option is a nickname system that allows players to hide their name in matches, and play under an alternate username. This helps players that may receive a notable amount of attention in-game, such as streamers, hide their identity.

Brutal Swarm
Brutal Swarm, the third season of Year 7, was released on September 13, 2022 and marks the introduction of Grim, an attacker from Singapore, who brings the Kawan Hive Launcher. This gadget is a grenade launcher that shoots canisters that will stick to a surface, and drop a swarm of nanobots that track defenders walking through them. Any defender in the swarm will be continuously pinged to the attacking team, giving their location away in real time. Once a defender leaves the affected area of the swarm, the nanobots will continue to ping them every few seconds, until the effect goes away after a few pings. No new map was released in Brutal Swarm, but the map from the Road To S.I. events was introduced to the casual and ranked map pool under the name Stadium Bravo.

The season introduced a multitude of changes to operators and weapons. A new secondary gadget for attackers, called the impact EMP, was given to several operators. Its purpose is similar to Thatcher's EMP gadget, disabling electronic devices in its area of effect. However, unlike Thatcher's EMP, it explodes upon impact with a surface, has a smaller area of effect, and disables devices for a shorter period of time.

The recoil patterns of every weapon were reworked for Brutal Swarm. To supplement these changes in recoil, several other adjustments were made to the weapons of the game. In an attempt to make all weapons more flexible, the muzzle brake and flash hider barrel attachments were given to all weapons. The vertical grip, angled grip, and extended barrel attachments were also given to more weapons. Weapons using suppressors no longer have a damage reduction.

In terms of core gameplay, the map ban system was expanded to 5 maps per match, having previously been 3 maps. This change was made to broaden the amount of maps being played in ranked and unranked.

Solar Raid
Operation Solar Raid was released on December 6, 2022. This season introduces Solis, a Colombian defending operator, with the Spec-IO Electro Sensor. This is a unique gadget that detects enemy electronic devices when activated, and allows the player to ping them for teammates to see. Solis can also activate a "Cluster Scan," which will ping all devices in her sight for her teammates. Solar Raid added the Nighthaven Labs map, which is the headquarters of Nighthaven located in Singapore.

Solar Raid marks the release of Ranked 2.0. In the new version of Ranked, everyone starts at the same rank and increases or decreases depending on the outcome of their matches. All ranks are now evenly divided into five tiers each. A player's MMR, now known as a Skill Rating, no longer determines their rank, but instead how quickly they rank up. A player's Skill Rating will fluctuate over time, and will change more or less depending on how you perform against those with a higher or lower Skill Rating than you. This system eliminates the need for the 10 placement matches previously required to be placed in a rank. With the Ranked 2.0 system, the matchmaking restriction for MMR (which prevented players from playing Ranked with others that had significantly higher or lower ranks) was removed due to the new ranking system. In addition to the ranking system changes, a new rank, known as Emerald, has also been added between Platinum and Diamond.

The battle pass has been changed in Solar Raid. It is no longer a linear path, and is now a map-like progression system with different paths that the player can choose to travel. While the old battle pass had specified rewards for each tier, the new one allows the player to unlock "tiles" with their battle pass tokens (obtained from leveling the pass up), which allows flexibility for users to unlock rewards in virtually any order they want.

Solar Raid introduces cross-progression and cross-play for consoles. The cross-progression system allows users to synchronize progress across all the platforms they've played on. Things like cosmetics, clearance level, renown, R6 Credits, and battle pass progress are now linked to the user's Ubisoft account, and are shared on every platform that the user has played on. Console cross-play lets users on different consoles (such as a player on Xbox Series X and a player on PlayStation 5) play together. Console users are unable to play with PC players.

The reputation system's full beta was released in Solar Raid. This system classifies users under 5 categories depending on their in-game behavior, ranging from "dishonorable" to "exemplary." Players with a positive standing will receive benefits like in-game items, while those in negative standing will be penalized with sanctions.

Year 8

Commanding Force 
Operation Commanding Force was released on March 7, 2023 and introduced Brava, a Brazilian Attacking operator.

References

External links 
 List of seasons on official website

Tom Clancy's Rainbow Six games